90's My Life is an EP released by The Pillows on October 25, 1990. It was re-released on March 8, 2004 as 90's My Life Returns with five additional tracks. The original EP, like its predecessor Pantomime, has since gone out of print.

Track listing

References

the pillows cast [1989-2009] 20th Anniversary Special Edition
『90'S MY LIFE returns』ライナーノーツ

The Pillows EPs
1990 EPs
Japanese-language EPs